ODIN provides RFID (Radio-Frequency Identification) software for the Aerospace, Government, Healthcare, Financial Services and Social Media markets. ODIN's world headquarters is located in San Diego, CA. ODIN was acquired by Quake Global in December 2012 and continues to focus on healthcare and asset tracking.

History 
ODIN won a $14.6M contract from the United States Department of Defense Defense Logistics Agency (DLA).

Acquisition Activity 
In December 2010 ODIN announced the acquisition of Reva Systems. Terms of the deal were not publicly disclosed. Reva raised around $35 million in venture funding from Charles River Ventures, Northbridge Partners and Cisco.

ODIN was purchased by Quake Global in 2012 for an undisclosed sum and continues to focus on healthcare and asset tracking.

See also
 RFID
 Information Technology
 Symbol Technologies
 Intermec
 Omni-ID

References 

"Airbus taps ODIN for RFID roll-out" RFID Update, p.

DoD Wants Your RFID Shipments: Five Steps To Compliance, RFID Solutions Online, by Scott Decker and Bret Kinsella, ODIN technologies

Pharma’s Flirtation With RFID — Will There Be A Second Date, RFID Solutions Online, by Bret Kinsella, ODIN technologies

The 5 Elements of a Successful RFID Implementation by Bret Kinsella, ODIN technologies

ODIN Benchmarks Globe-Trotting Tags RFID Journal

 ODIN Benchmarks RFID Readers RFID Journal

 FCC Grants ODIN Experimental License RFID Journal

UHF vs HF for Pharma RFID: And the Winner Is . . .  Pharmaceutical Commerce

United States Department of Commerce Awards ODIN technologies the first Excellence in Innovation Award

Odin Technologies Aims to Be the Chief of RFID The Washington Post

NI+C of Japan teams with Odin Technologies for scientific RFID testing Test and Measurement World

ODIN Technologies Establishes RFID Joint Venture in Europe, ODIN Budapest SecureID News

Nine ODIN technologies Engineers Earn CompTIA RFID+ Certification

"Financial Services Technology Consortium hires ODIN technologies to set numbering and performance standard"

Automatic identification and data capture
Companies based in Dulles, Virginia
Electronics companies of the United States
Radio-frequency identification
Radio-frequency identification companies